The Major Armstrong award, named after the inventor of  FM radio, Edwin Howard Armstrong, is presented "to AM and FM stations for excellence and originality in radio broadcasting" by the Armstrong Memorial Research Foundation at Columbia University.

The Institute of Electrical and Electronics Engineers  Communications Society also has an award named after Edwin Armstrong,   as does Radio Club of America.

References

External links
 IEEE Communications Society Edwin Howard Armstrong Achievement Award
 Armstrong Medal

Awards and prizes of Columbia University
American radio awards